Lu Lu Sein is a 2020 Burmese comedy television series. It aired on 5 Plus, from July 31, to October 30, 2020, on every Friday, Saturday and Sunday at 20:30 for 40 episodes.

Cast
Soe Pyae Thazin as Lu Lu Sein
Kyaw Kyaw as Rosie
May Barani Thaw as Saung Kha Hnin
Thura Htoo as Lin Thu
Min Hein
Lin Zarni Zaw

References

Burmese television series